White Noise is a 2005 supernatural horror thriller film directed by Geoffrey Sax and starring Michael Keaton. The title refers to electronic voice phenomena (EVP), where voices, which some believe to be from the "other side", can be heard on audio recordings.

The film did very well at the box office despite generally poor reviews from both critics and audiences. The commercial success of White Noise led Universal and other studios to realize that there was an untapped audience for horror films released in January, and began releasing higher-quality horror films during that period, usually dismissed as the winter dump months of the film calendar.

Plot
Jonathan Rivers is an architect and lives with his wife Anna until her unexpected death. Eventually, he is contacted by Raymond Price, whose son has also died. He says he has recorded messages from Anna through electronic voice phenomena (EVP). While Jonathan is initially dismissive and angered, he later learns about his wife's tragic drowning. Desperate, he begins to believe that the recorded voice is indeed that of his wife, and becomes obsessed with trying to contact her himself. He is warned by a psychic that, while she takes measures to avoid hostile entities, EVP is an indiscriminate process that offers no such safeguards. A woman named Sarah Tate, who also came to Raymond for his EVP work because she lost her fiancé, befriends Jonathan.

Raymond is found dead. Jonathan begins to be followed by three demons attracted by his obsession with EVP, and finds that some of the messages he receives are from people who are not yet dead, but may soon be. Jonathan hears cries from a woman whom he finds in a car with a child. He is able to save the child, but not the woman. At that woman's funeral, which Jonathan and Sarah both attend, Jonathan approaches the husband and tells him about what happened. The latter thanks Jonathan for saving his son but then demands to be left alone. Afterwards, Jonathan sees images of another person, a missing woman named Mary Freeman, while working with his EVP devices. Sarah is later seriously injured by a fall from a balcony while possessed by the demons, an incident which was foreshadowed by Sarah's image being among those on the EVP devices.

Jonathan locates the site of his wife's death by following signs on recordings and he also finds his wife's abandoned car. Jonathan finds a set of computers and electronic equipment on site. A construction worker from his company, who has been doing his own EVP work, is holding Mary captive. He has been under the control of the demons to kill all these people, including Anna. The three demons torture Jonathan by breaking his arms and legs and cause him to fall to his death, but a SWAT team arrives and are able to save Mary by shooting the construction worker dead. After his funeral, Jonathan's voice can be heard on the car radio through static interference saying "I'm sorry" to his son, who recognizes the voice and smiles. Sarah, at the graveside in a wheelchair, is menaced by odd noises. Right before the credits, the camera flashes to a TV where Jonathan and his wife are visible. A closing intertitle states that one of twelve out of thousands of EVP messages is threatening.

Cast

 Michael Keaton as Jonathan Rivers
 Deborah Kara Unger as Sarah Tate, bookstore owner
 Chandra West as Anna Rivers, a writer
 Ian McNeice as Raymond Price

Production
In May 2003, it was announced Michael Keaton was attached to star the film with principal photography slated to begin in August of that year.

Reception 
White Noise was generally negatively received by critics, with a 7% rating at Rotten Tomatoes, with the site's consensus being "While there are some built-in scares, the movie is muddled and unsatisfying".

Sequel
A sequel titled White Noise: The Light was released in January 2007.

Legacy
White Noise's surprising box-office success for a movie released on the first weekend after New Year's Day, the start of the winter dump months and usually one of the worst weekends for new releases, led studios to reassess their releasing strategies for horror films. In 2013, Universal chairman Adam Fogelson said, "The first weekend in January used to be a non-starter for people; we had this little horror movie White Noise that did business, and that has become a place where movies [like] that tend to operate."

If a horror film as poorly received as White Noise could nevertheless make a significant amount of money in January, studios realized, a quality film in that genre could do even better. The following year, an elaborate viral marketing campaign gave Paramount's found footage horror film Cloverfield a $40 million opening weekend, which remained the record for January until Ride Along in 2014. In 2012 Paramount beat White Noise's first-weekend success with The Devil Inside, which took in $35 million despite a strongly negative reaction from critics and audiences. "Ever since White Noise was a hit in 2005, that's what started it. If you look back at every first weekend, besides expanding titles, the only new release is usually one crappy horror movie," C. Robert Cargill of Ain't It Cool News told Hollywood.com in 2013.

See also
List of ghost films

References

External links
 
 
 
  
 

2005 films
2005 horror films
English-language Canadian films
2000s horror thriller films
2000s mystery films
2000s supernatural films
American ghost films
American horror thriller films
American mystery films
American supernatural horror films
American supernatural thriller films
British ghost films
British horror thriller films
British mystery films
British supernatural films
Canadian ghost films
Canadian mystery films
Canadian thriller films
Demons in film
Films directed by Geoffrey Sax
Films shot in Vancouver
Universal Pictures films
Gold Circle Films films
Brightlight Pictures films
British supernatural horror films
Canadian supernatural horror films
2000s supernatural horror films
2000s English-language films
2000s American films
2000s Canadian films
2000s British films